Unterammergau is a municipality in the district of Garmisch-Partenkirchen, in Bavaria, Germany. It is the site of the 11th-century Chapel of St Leonhard, patron saint of horses, which is the terminus of the annual Leonhardritt and Blessing of the Animals.

Transport
The municipality has a railway station, on the Ammergau Railway.

See also
Oberammergau
Blessing of animals

References

External links
 Official site
 Tourism site

Garmisch-Partenkirchen (district)